Run Rabbit Run is a 2023 Australian psychological horror film directed by Daina Reid, starring Sarah Snook and Greta Scacchi, from a script by Hannah Kent. The film was released at the Sundance Film Festival on 19 January 2023. The film will be released on Netflix.

Synopsis
A fertility doctor notices strange behaviour in her own child.

Cast 
 Sarah Snook as Sarah
 Lily LaTorre as Mia
 Damon Herriman as Peter
 Greta Scacchi as Joan

Production
In June 2020 Elisabeth Moss was attached to the project with XYZ Films and Daina Reid directing. STXfilms was distributing the film. Moss had previously worked with Reid on the television series The Handmaid's Tale. In December 2021 Snook was announced as on board the project after Moss had to pull out due to scheduling issues as STXfilms was no longer involved in the film. The following month Damon Herriman and Greta Scacchi were added to the cast, with filming starting in the same week. Principal photography took place on location in Melbourne, Victoria and South Australia. The film was produced by Anna McLeish and Sarah Shaw for Carver Films.

Release
Run Rabbit Run was released on 19 January 2023 at the Sundance Film Festival. The film will be released on streaming service Netflix in 2023 in the United States, Australia, the United Kingdom and other territories.

Reception
Review aggregator Rotten Tomatoes reports that 36% of 45 critics have given the film a positive review, with an average rating of 4.9 out of 10. The website's critical consensus reads, "Run Rabbit Run boasts some powerhouse performances, but they're largely overwhelmed by a thin plot and overreliance on stale horror tropes." On Metacritic, it has a weighted average score of 55 out of 100 based on 7 critics, indicating "mixed or average reviews".

Damon Wise from Deadline Hollywood described the film as "effective but perhaps overlong" but with "a poetic resonance" that makes for a "nightmarish essay on action and consequence, not to mention the isolation and travails that come with single parenthood". The film is said to "deliberately overlap notions of reality and abstraction", and praise comes for the actors; "Lily LaTorre, who plays Mia, is an absolute find…and her impressively unreadable, protean performance is the motor that drives the film...But the film rests squarely on the shoulders of Succession star Snook, who does a lot of heavy lifting, keeping us sympathetic right up to, and maybe even beyond, the point of revelation".

References

External links
 
 

Upcoming films
2023 independent films
Australian independent films
Australian supernatural horror films
Films shot in Melbourne
Films shot in South Australia